A partial lunar eclipse took place on Saturday, August 27, 1988, the second of two lunar eclipses in 1988, the first being on March 3, 1988. The Earth's shadow on the moon was clearly visible in this eclipse, with 29.159% of the Moon in shadow; the partial eclipse lasted for 1 hour, 52 minutes and 59.7 seconds. The Moon was only 5 hours and 48 minutes before perigee (Perigee on Saturday, August 27, 1988 at 04:53 p.m. UTC or 16:53), making it 6.3% larger than average

Visibility

Relations to other lunar eclipses

Eclipses of 1988 
 A penumbral lunar eclipse on March 3.
 A total solar eclipse on March 18.
 A partial lunar eclipse on August 27.
 An annular solar eclipse on September 11.

Saros series 
This eclipse is part of Saros cycle series 118.

Lunar year series

Metonic cycle (19 years)

Half-Saros cycle
A lunar eclipse will be preceded and followed by solar eclipses by 9 years and 5.5 days (a half saros). This lunar eclipse is related to two solar eclipses of Solar Saros 125.

Tritos series 
 Preceded: Lunar eclipse of September 27, 1977
 Followed: Lunar eclipse of July 28, 1999

Tzolkinex 
 Preceded: Lunar eclipse of July 17, 1981
 Followed: Lunar eclipse of October 8, 1995

See also 
List of lunar eclipses
List of 20th-century lunar eclipses

Notes

External links 
 

1988-08
1988 in science
August 1988 events